The 1946 Claxton Shield was the seventh annual Claxton Shield, an Australian national baseball tournament—the first time the tournament was held after a seven-year break due to World War II. It was held at Petersham Oval and Marrickville Oval in Sydney from 3 to 10 August, and was won by the hosts New South Wales for the fourth time in a row. With this tournament win, they overtook South Australia as the outright leading state in Claxton Shield tournament wins.

The other participating teams were Victoria and hosts South Australia. The two newest teams to the tournament—Western Australia and Queensland—did not participate. However both did host an interstate series: Western Australia hosted a South Australian team, and Queensland hosted New South Wales after the Sydney season.

Format
With the reduction of participating teams back to the original three, the format also returned to a pure round-robin tournament. Once again, each team met each other team twice over the course of the week. In each game, two competition points were on offer to the teams. The points were awarded as follows:
 Win – two points
 Tie – one point
 Loss – no points
At the end of the tournament, the team with the most points was declared the winner, and awarded the Claxton Shield.

Results

All-Australian team
At the conclusion of the tournament, representatives from the Australian Baseball Council selected an All-Australian team. It was the second such Australian team selected at the end of a Claxton Shield tournament. As had been the case in the 1939 side, New South Wales players dominated the team, with seven players selected.

References

Bibliography
 
 

1946 in baseball
1946 in Australian sport
1946
August 1946 sports events in Australia